Mr. Wonderful is the second studio album by British blues rock band Fleetwood Mac, released on 23 August 1968. This all-blues album was broadly similar to their debut album, albeit with some changes to personnel and recording method. The album was recorded live in the studio with miked amplifiers and PA system, rather than plugged into the board.  A horn section was introduced and Christine Perfect (later Christine McVie) of Chicken Shack was featured on keyboards. In the US, the album was not issued under the name Mr. Wonderful, though around half of the tracks appeared on English Rose.

An expanded version of Mr. Wonderful was included in the box set The Complete Blue Horizon Sessions.

The song "Lazy Poker Blues" was covered by Status Quo on their 1971 album Ma Kelly's Greasy Spoon.

Reception
Compared to the huge success of the band's first album, Fleetwood Mac, this follow-up received rather muted critical reviews: AllMusic described it as "a disappointment". Four of the songs, "Dust My Broom", "Doctor Brown", "Need Your Love Tonight" and "Coming Home", all begin with an identical Elmore James riff. "Evenin' Boogie" was the first instrumental released by Fleetwood Mac.

Sputnik Music describes the style as "vocally conservative, sticking to gruff mannerisms, and it often sounds like Green is drunkedly wandering through the music. The production adds further insult to injury, as it muffles his voice rather than amplifying it and makes the instruments sound murky."

Track listing

Personnel 
Fleetwood Mac
Peter Green – vocals, guitar, harmonica
Jeremy Spencer – vocals, slide guitar
John McVie – bass guitar
Mick Fleetwood – drums

Additional personnel
Christine Perfect – keyboards, piano, vocals
Duster Bennett – harmonica
Steve Gregory – alto saxophone
Dave Howard – alto saxophone
Johnny Almond – tenor saxophone
Roland Vaughan – tenor saxophone

Production
Producer: Mike Vernon
Engineer: Mike Ross
Coordination: Richard Vernon
Cover design: Terence Ibbott
Photography: Terence Ibbott

Charts

References

Fleetwood Mac albums
1968 albums
Blue Horizon Records albums
Albums produced by Mike Vernon (record producer)